Kurduvadi Junction is a railway station located in Solapur district in the Indian state of Maharashtra and serves Kurduvadi. It is a junction station at the intersection point of  Mumbai–Chennai line and Latur road–Miraj line.  Kurduvadi Workshop is located next to the station.

History
This station was earlier known as Barshi Road Railway Station.

GIPR extended its line to Raichur in 1871 and met the line of Madras Railway thereby establishing direct Mumbai–Chennai link.

The Pune–Raichur sector of the Mumbai–Chennai line was opened in stages: the portion from Diksal in Pune to Barshi Road was opened in 1859, from Barshi Road to Mohol in 1860 and from Mohol to Sholapur also in 1860. Work on the line from Sholapur southwards was begun in 1865.

Barsi Light Railway was a -long, -wide railway from Kurduvadi to Latur. The narrow-gauge line from Barsi Road to Pandharpur was extended to Miraj in 1927.

Amenities
Kurduvadi railway station has a public call office booth with facilities for subscriber trunk dialling, refreshment stalls serving vegetarian and non-vegetarian food, retiring room, waiting room, and book stall.

Workshop
Kurduvadi Workshop was set up for repair of narrow-gauge steam locomotives, coaches and wagons by Barsi Light Railway in 1930. With the reduction in narrow-gauge rolling stock, the Workshop has taken up new activities as per requirements. Kurduvadi Workshop now undertakes rehabilitation of 20 broad-gauge wagons per month.

Kurduvadi had a narrow-gauge diesel-loco shed for Barsi Light Railway. The shed was closed down after conversion of the narrow-gauge railway.

Electrification
The Pune–Solapur–Wadi line is being electrified with a loan of Rs. 1,500 crore from Asian Development Bank. Work was initiated in 2012.

Track doubling
The railway track in the Daund–Wadi sector is being doubled at a cost of Rs. 700 crore.
The railway track in the Kurduwadi–Latur Road sector will be doubled at a cost of Rs. 700 crore.

References

External links
Trains at Kurudvadi

Railway stations in Solapur district
Railway junction stations in Maharashtra
Solapur railway division
Railway stations in India opened in 1859
1859 establishments in India